Langheinrich is a surname. Notable people with the surname include:

 Paul Langheinrich (1895–1979), German genealogist
 Ulf Langheinrich (born 1960), German visual artist and composer

German-language surnames